Philippe Marchand (1 September 1939 – 10 January 2018) was a French politician. 
He was member of the Parliament and President of the general council of Charente-Maritime.  He failed to act to establish the Giacometti Foundation.

He was born in Angoulême, Charente, and died in Saintes, Charente-Maritime. 
He called for resignations after the George Habash affair.

References

1939 births
2018 deaths
People from Angoulême
Politicians from Nouvelle-Aquitaine
Socialist Party (France) politicians
French interior ministers
Deputies of the 6th National Assembly of the French Fifth Republic
Deputies of the 7th National Assembly of the French Fifth Republic
Deputies of the 8th National Assembly of the French Fifth Republic
Deputies of the 9th National Assembly of the French Fifth Republic
Members of the Conseil d'État (France)
Deaths from cancer in France